Lourosa is the name of multiple locations in Portugal:

 Lourosa (Oliveira do Hospital), a parish in the municipality of Oliveira do Hospital
 Lourosa (Santa Maria da Feira)